Robert A. Geisler (July 19, 1925 – April 7, 1993) was a former Democratic member of the Pennsylvania House of Representatives.

Early life
He was born and raised by Adam Alexander Geisler (1898-1974) and Margaret Geisler (1898-1971) and had 8 siblings in total counting him. His family is of Austrian descent.

Military and Political Background
He enrolled into Langley High School and attended Duquesne University. After he graduated he was drafted into the United States Air Force and served in World War II. In 1947 he became an auditor for the city of Pittsburgh and ended his service in 1952. During the 1969 house election, he ran for the democrat side and ultimately won the race. He became a member of the 27th district of Pennsylvania house of representatives starting from that year and ended his term in 1978.

Death
In the early hours of April 7, 1993, Robert had died from a sudden heart attack. He was only 67 years old. Robert is survived through his wife and two daughters.

References

Democratic Party members of the Pennsylvania House of Representatives
1925 births
1993 deaths
Politicians from Pittsburgh
Military personnel from Pittsburgh
Duquesne University alumni
20th-century American politicians